Calcium aluminosilicate, an aluminosilicate compound with calcium cations, most typically has formula CaAl2Si2O8.  
In minerals, as a feldspar, it can be found as anorthite, an end-member of the plagioclase series.

Uses
As a food additive, it is sometimes designated E556. It is known to the FDA as, at under 2% by weight, an anti-caking agent for table salt, and as an ingredient in vanilla powder.

References

Aluminosilicates
Calcium compounds
E-number additives